Unblessing the Purity is the second EP by Swedish death metal band Bloodbath. It was released on March 10, 2008, on Peaceville Records. It is their first release since Resurrection Through Carnage to include Mikael Åkerfeldt on vocals. Per "Sodomizer" Eriksson replaced Dan Swanö on guitar beginning with this EP. The cover art is by Dusty Peterson, who won the band's contest for fan-made cover art. The album is packaged in a super-jewel case with a slipcase cut to fit. Unblessing the Purity is only available directly through mail-order via Peaceville Records or Snapper Music, and digitally.

Track listing

Personnel

Bloodbath
Mikael Åkerfeldt – vocals
Anders "Blakkheim" Nyström – guitar
Per "Sodomizer" Eriksson – guitar
Jonas Renkse – bass
Martin "Axe" Axenrot – drums

References

Bloodbath albums
2008 EPs
Peaceville Records albums